Ellen Perez and Arina Rodionova were the defending champions, but lost in the quarterfinals to Vania King and Claire Liu.

King and Liu went on to win the title, defeating Hayley Carter and Jamie Loeb in the final, 4–6, 6–2, [10–5].

Seeds

Draw

Draw

References
Main Draw

Koser Jewelers Tennis Challenge - Doubles